Elizaveta Nikolayevna Klevanovich (born 22 March 2001) is a Russian swimmer. She competed in the 2020 Summer Olympics.

References

2001 births
Living people
People from Tyumen
Swimmers at the 2020 Summer Olympics
Russian female swimmers
Swimmers at the 2018 Summer Youth Olympics
Youth Olympic gold medalists for Russia
Russian female freestyle swimmers
Olympic swimmers of Russia
Universiade medalists in swimming
Sportspeople from Tyumen Oblast
Universiade bronze medalists for Russia
Medalists at the 2019 Summer Universiade